Jørgen Ludvig Hansen (24 December 1931 – 30 April 1986) was a Danish footballer who played as a forward or midfielder. He made in 22 appearances for the Denmark national team from 1955 to 1962. He was also part of Denmark's squad at the 1960 Summer Olympics, but he did not play in any matches.

References

External links
 

1931 births
1986 deaths
People from Bornholm
Danish men's footballers
Association football forwards
Denmark international footballers
Olympic footballers of Denmark
Footballers at the 1960 Summer Olympics
Næstved Boldklub players
Sportspeople from the Capital Region of Denmark